An ordered graph is a graph with a total order over its nodes.

In an ordered graph, the parents of a node are the nodes that are adjacent to it and precede it in the ordering. The width of a node is the number of its parents, and the width of an ordered graph is the maximal width of its nodes.

The induced graph of an ordered graph is obtained by adding some edges to an ordering graph, using the method outlined below. The induced width of an ordered graph is the width of its induced graph.

Given an ordered graph, its induced graph is another ordered graph obtained by joining some pairs of nodes that are both parents of another node. In particular, nodes are considered in turn according to the ordering, from last to first. For each node, if two of its parents are not joined by an edge, that edge is added. Since the parents of a node are always connected with each other, the induced graph is always chordal.

As an example, the induced graph of an ordered graph is calculated. The ordering is represented by the position of its nodes in the figures: a is the last node and d is the first.

Node  is considered first. Since they are not joined by an edge, one is added.

Node  is considered second. While this node only has  as a parent in the original graph, it also has  as a parent in the partially built induced graph.

Considering  does not produce any change, as this node has no parents.

Processing nodes in order matters, as the introduced edges may create new parents, which are then relevant to the introduction of new edges. The following example shows that a different ordering produces a different induced graph of the same original graph.

Therefore, an edge between them is added. This node has only one parent. Therefore, no new edge is added. As a result, no new edge is introduced. Since  has no parent as well, the final induced graph is the one above. This induced graph differs from the one produced by the previous ordering.

See also

Directed graph
Local consistency

References

 

Constraint programming
Extensions and generalizations of graphs